Callapa is a location in the La Paz Department in Bolivia. It is the seat of the Santiago de Callapa Municipality, the eighth municipal section of the Pacajes Province.

References

External links 
 Detailed map of Pacajes Province

Populated places in La Paz Department (Bolivia)